Tampa is a city on the Gulf Coast of the U.S. state of Florida. The city's borders include the north shore of Tampa Bay and the east shore of Old Tampa Bay. Tampa is the largest city in the Tampa Bay area and the seat of Hillsborough County. With a population of 384,959 according to the 2020 census, Tampa is the third-most populous city in Florida after Jacksonville and Miami.

Tampa was as a military center during the 19th century with the establishment of Fort Brooke. The cigar industry was also brought to the city by Vincente Martinez Ybor, after whom Ybor City is named. Tampa was reincorporated as a city in 1887 following the Civil War. Tampa's economy is driven by tourism, health care, finance, insurance, technology, construction, and the maritime industry. The bay's port is the largest in the state, responsible for over $15 billion in economic impact.

The city is part of the Tampa-St. Petersburg-Clearwater, Florida Metropolitan Statistical Area, which is a four-county area composed of roughly 3.1 million residents, making it the second-largest metropolitan statistical area (MSA) in the state and the fourth largest in the Southeastern United States, behind Washington D.C., Miami, and Atlanta. The Greater Tampa Bay area has over 4 million residents and generally includes the Tampa and Sarasota metro areas.

Etymology
When the pioneer community living near the US Army outpost of Fort Brooke was incorporated in 1849, it was called "Tampa Town" and the name was shortened to simply "Tampa" in 1855. The earliest instance of the name "Tampa", in the form "Tanpa", appears in the memoirs of Hernando de Escalante Fontaneda, who spent 17 years as a captive of the Calusa and traveled through much of peninsular Florida. He described Tanpa as an important Calusa town to the north of the Calusa domain, possibly under another chief. Archaeologist Jerald Milanich places the town of Tanpa at the mouth of Charlotte Harbor. The entrances to Tampa Bay and Charlotte Harbor are obscured by barrier islands, and their locations, and the names applied to them, were a source of confusion to explorers, surveyors and map-makers from the 16th century through the 18th century. Bahía Tampa and Bahía de Espíritu Santo were each used, at one time or another, for the modern Tampa Bay and Charlotte Harbor. Tampa Bay was labeled Bahía de Espíritu Santo (Bay of the Holy Spirit) in the earliest Spanish maps of Florida, but became known as B. Tampa (Bahía Tampa or Tampa Bay) as early as 1576. "B. Tampa", corresponding to Tampa Bay, appeared for the first time on a printed map in Antonio de Herrera y Tordesillas's Description del Destricto del Audiencia de la Espanola, from his book Descripcion de las Indias Ocidentales, printed in Madrid in 1601.

A British map of 1705 also shows B. Tampa, with "Carlos Bay" for Charlotte Harbor to the south, while a 1748 British map had "B. del Spirito Santo" for Tampa Bay and, again, "Carlos Bay" to the south. A Spanish map of 1757 renamed Tampa Bay as "San Fernando". As late as 1774, Bernard Romans called Tampa Bay "Bay of Espiritu Santo", with "Tampa Bay" restricted to the Northwest arm (what is now Old Tampa Bay) and the northeast arm named "Hillsborough Bay". The name may have come from the Calusa language or possibly, the Timucua language. Some scholars have compared "Tampa" to "itimpi", which means "close to" or "nearby" in the Creek language, but its meaning is not known.

People from Tampa are generally known as "Tampans", "Tampanians", or "Tampeños". Local authorities consulted by Michael Kruse of the Tampa Bay Times suggest that "Tampan" was historically more common, while "Tampanian" became popular when the former term came to be seen as a potential insult. A mix of Cuban, Italian, and Spanish immigrants began arriving in the late 1800s to found and work in the new communities of Ybor City and West Tampa. By about 1900, these newcomers came to be known as "Tampeños" (or "Tampeñas" for females), a term that is still sometimes used to refer to their descendants living in the area, and potentially, to all residents of Tampa regardless of their ethnic background.

History

Indigenous peoples and European exploration

The shores of Tampa Bay have been inhabited for thousands of years. A variant of the Weeden Island culture developed in the area by about 2000 years ago, with archeological evidence suggesting that these residents relied on the sea for most of their resources, as a vast majority of inhabited sites have been found on or near the shoreline and there is little evidence of farming. At the time of European contact in the early 16th century, several chiefdoms of the Safety Harbor culture dominated the area.

Early Spanish explorers interacted most extensively with the Tocobaga, whose principal town was at the northern end of Old Tampa Bay near today's Safety Harbor in Pinellas County. While there is a substantial historical record of the Tocobaga (and the Calusa, who lived to the south), there is less surviving documentation describing the Pohoy, who lived near the mouth of the Hillsborough River near today's downtown Tampa. However, evidence suggests that the language and culture of the Pohoy and other lesser-known groups around the bay were very similar to that of the Tocobaga.

Expeditions led by Pánfilo de Narváez and Hernando de Soto landed near Tampa, but neither conquistador stayed long. There is no natural gold or silver in Florida, and the native inhabitants repulsed Spanish attempts to establish a permanent settlement or convert them to Catholicism. The fighting resulted in a few deaths, but the many more deaths were caused by infectious diseases brought from Europe, which devastated the population of Native Americans across Florida and the entire Western Hemisphere. The indigenous cultures of the Tampa Bay area had collapsed by around 1600, leaving the west coast of Spanish Florida largely depopulated and ignored for more than 200 years.

In the mid-18th century, events in the American colonies and the early United States drove the Seminole people into northern Florida, but they did not move into central Florida until after the United States gained control of Florida in 1821.

Before the American period, the Tampa Bay area had a handful of residents: Cuban and Native American fishermen who established small seasonal camps called "ranchos" on the shores of Tampa Bay. The largest was at the mouth of Spanishtown Creek in today's Hyde Park neighborhood along Bayshore Boulevard.

U.S. control

After purchasing Florida from Spain in 1821, the United States built forts and trading posts in the new territory. Fort Brooke was established in January 1824 at the mouth of the Hillsborough River on Tampa Bay, in Downtown Tampa.

Tampa was initially an isolated frontier outpost. The sparse civilian population practically abandoned the area during the Second Seminole War from 1835 to 1842, after which the Seminoles were forced out and many settlers returned.

Florida became the 27th state on March 3, 1845. On January 18, 1849, Tampa was officially incorporated as the "Village of Tampa." It was home to 185 civilians, or 974 total residents including military personnel, in 1850. Tampa was reincorporated as a town on December 15, 1855.

Civil War and Reconstruction

During the Civil War, Florida seceded along with most of the southern states to form the Confederate States of America, and Fort Brooke was defended by Confederate troops. Martial law was declared in Tampa in January 1862, and Tampa's city government ceased to operate for the duration of the war.

In 1861, the Union Navy set up a blockade around many southern ports to cut off the Confederacy. Several US Navy ships were stationed near the mouth of Tampa Bay, but small blockade running ships were often able to slip by the blockade to deliver cattle to Spanish Cuba, earning gold for the Confederate cause. On June 30, 1862, the gunboat USS Sagamore sailed into Tampa Bay and opened fire on Fort Brooke, which returned fire. The Sagamore withdrew after a few hours, and the Battle of Tampa caused little damage. During the Battle of Fort Brooke on October 16 and the Battle of Ballast Point on October 18, 1863, Union forces inflicted serious damage to the city's economy when, under the cover of another bombardment of the fort, troops landed and destroyed two blockade running ships that had been hidden upstream along the Hillsborough River.

In May 1864, Union troops landed again and took Fort Brooke largely unopposed. They destroyed much of the fort's facilities and confiscated the remaining military supplies other than the canons, which they tossed into the Hillsborough River, then left the "desolate" town after two days.

The Civil War ended in April 1865 with a Confederate defeat. In May 1865, federal troops arrived in Tampa to occupy the fort and the town as part of Reconstruction. They remained until August 1869.

During the immediate post-war period, Tampa was a poor, isolated fishing village with about 1000 residents and little industry. Yellow fever, borne by mosquitoes from nearby swamps, broke out several times during the 1860s and 1870s, causing more residents to leave. In 1869, residents voted to abolish the city of Tampa government.

The population of "Tampa Town" was about 800 by 1870 and dropped to about 700 by 1880. Fort Brooke was decommissioned in 1883, further impacting the local economy in the short run but opening up the waterfront for development. Except for two cannons displayed on the University of Tampa campus, all traces of the fort are gone.

1880s economic prosperity

In the mid-1880s, Tampa's fortunes took several sudden turns for the better. First, phosphate was discovered in the Bone Valley region southeast of Tampa in 1883. The mineral, vital for the production of fertilizers and other products, was soon being shipped from the Port of Tampa in great volume. Tampa is still a major phosphate exporter.

The discovery of phosphate, the arrival of Plant's railroad, and the founding of Ybor City and West Tampa—all in the mid-1880s—were crucial to Tampa's development. The once-struggling village of Tampa became a bustling boomtown almost overnight and had grown into one of the largest cities in Florida by 1900.

Plant's railroad

Henry B. Plant's narrow-gauge South Florida Railroad reached Tampa and its port in late 1883, finally connecting the small town to the nation's railroad system after years of efforts by local leaders. Previously, Tampa's overland transportation links had consisted of sandy roads stretching across the Florida countryside. Plant's railroad made it much easier to get goods in and out of the Tampa Bay area. Phosphate and commercial fishing exports could be sent north by rail, and many new products were brought into the Tampa market, along with the first tourists.

Ybor's cigars

The new railroad link enabled another important industry to come to Tampa. In 1885, the Tampa Board of Trade enticed Vicente Martinez Ybor to move his cigar manufacturing operations to Tampa from Key West. Proximity to Cuba made importation of "clear Havana tobacco" easy by sea, and Plant's railroad made shipment of finished cigars to the rest of the US market easy by land.

Since Tampa was still a small town at the time (population less than 5,000), Ybor built hundreds of small houses around his factory to accommodate the immediate influx of mainly Cuban and Spanish cigar workers. Ybor City's factories rolled their first cigars in 1886, and many different cigar manufacturers moved their operations to town in ensuing years. Many Italian and a few eastern European Jewish immigrants arrived starting in the late 1880s, opening businesses and shops that catered to cigar workers. By 1900, over 10,000 immigrants had moved to the neighborhood. Several thousand more Cuban immigrants built West Tampa, another cigar-centric suburb founded a few years later by Hugh MacFarlane. Between them, two "Latin" communities combined to exponentially expand Tampa's population, economic base, and tax revenues, as Tampa became the "Cigar Capital of the World".

Early 20th century

During the first few decades of the 20th century, the cigar-making industry was the backbone of Tampa's economy. The factories in Ybor City and West Tampa made an enormous number of cigars—in the peak year of 1929, over 500 million cigars were hand rolled in the city.

In 1904, a civic association of local businessmen dubbed themselves Ye Mystic Krewe of Gasparilla (named after local mythical pirate José Gaspar), and staged an "invasion" of the city followed by a parade. With a few exceptions, the Gasparilla Pirate Festival has been held every year since.

Bolita and organized crime

Beginning in the late 19th century, illegal bolita lotteries were very popular among the Tampa working classes, especially in Ybor City. In the early 1920s, this small-time operation was taken over by Charlie Wall, the rebellious son of a prominent Tampa family, and went big-time. Bolita was able to openly thrive only because of kick-backs and bribes to key local politicians and law enforcement officials, and many were on the take.

Profits from the bolita lotteries and Prohibition-era bootlegging led to the development of several organized crime factions in the city. Charlie Wall was the first major boss, but various power struggles culminated in consolidation of control by Sicilian mafioso Santo Trafficante Sr. and his faction in the 1950s. After his death in 1954 from cancer, control passed to his son, Santo Trafficante Jr., who established alliances with families in New York City and extended his power throughout Florida and into Batista-era Cuba.

The era of rampant and open corruption ended in the 1950s, when Estes Kefauver's traveling organized crime hearings came to town and were followed by the sensational misconduct trials of several local officials. Although many of the worst offenders in government and the mob were not charged, the trials helped to end the sense of lawlessness which had prevailed in Tampa for decades.

Mid to late 20th century

Tampa grew considerably as a result of World War II. Prior to the United States' involvement in the conflict, construction began on MacDill Field, which served as a main base for Army Air Corps and later Army Air Forces operations just before and during World War II, with multiple auxiliary airfields around the Tampa Bay area and surrounding counties. At the end of the war, MacDill remained as an active military installation, while the auxiliary fields reverted to civilian control. Two of these auxiliary fields would later become the present-day Tampa International Airport and St. Pete–Clearwater International Airport. With the establishment of an independent U.S. Air Force in 1947, MacDill Field became MacDill Air Force Base.

During the 1950s and 1960s, Tampa saw record-setting population growth that has not been seen since. This growth spurred expansion of the city's highways and bridges, bringing thousands into the city and creating opportunities for Tampa business owners, who welcomed the influx of tourists and new residents. It was during this time period in the city's history that two of the most popular tourist attractions in the area were developed – Busch Gardens and Lowry Park. Many of the well-known institutions that play an important role in the economic development of the city were established during this time period.

The University of South Florida was established in North Tampa in 1956 and opened for students in September 1960. The school spurred the construction of several residential and commercial developments in the previously agriculture-dominated area around the new campus. Overall, Tampa continued to expand away from the city center during the 1960s as new hospitals, schools, churches and subdivisions all began appearing to accommodate the growth. Many business offices began moving away from the traditional downtown office building into more convenient neighborhood office plazas.

In 1970, the U.S. Census Bureau reported city's population as 80.0% white and 19.7% black.

Four attempts have been made to consolidate the municipal government of the city of Tampa with the county government of Hillsborough County (1967, 1970, 1971, and 1972), all of which failed at the ballot box; the greatest loss was the most recent attempt in 1972, with the final tally being 33,160 (31%) in favor and 73,568 (69%) against the proposed charter.

East Tampa, historically a mostly black community, was the scene of several race riots during and for some time after the period of racial segregation, mainly due to problems between residents and the Tampa Police Department.

Geography

Topography
Tampa is bordered by two bodies of water, Old Tampa Bay and Hillsborough Bay, which flow together to form Tampa Bay, which in turn flows into the Gulf of Mexico. The Hillsborough River flows into Hillsborough Bay, passing directly in front of Downtown Tampa and supplying Tampa's main source of fresh water. The Palm River is a smaller river flowing from just east of the city into McKay Bay, which is a smaller inlet, sited at the northeast end of Hillsborough Bay. Tampa's geography is marked by the Interbay Peninsula which divides Hillsborough Bay (the eastern) from Old Tampa Bay (the western).

Climate
The Tampa Bay area has a humid subtropical climate (Köppen Cfa), although due to its location on the Florida peninsula on Tampa Bay and the Gulf of Mexico, it shows some characteristics of a tropical climate. Tampa's climate generally features hot and humid summers with frequent thunderstorms and dry and mild winters. Average highs range from  year round, and lows . The city of Tampa is split between two USDA climate zones. According to the 2012 USDA Plant Hardiness Zone Map, Tampa is listed as USDA zone 9b north of Kennedy Boulevard away from the bay and 10a near the shorelines and in the interbay peninsula south of Kennedy Boulevard. Zone 10a is about the northern limit of where coconut palms and royal palms can be grown, although some specimens do grow in northern Tampa. Recently, certain palm tree species in the area, along with the rest of the state, have been and continue to be severely affected by a plant disease called Texas phoenix palm decline, which has caused a considerable amount of damage to various local palm tree landscapes and threatens the native palm tree species in the region.

Tropical storms
Though threatened by tropical systems almost every hurricane season (which runs from June 1 to November 30), Tampa seldom feels major effects from tropical storms or hurricanes. No hurricane has made landfall in the immediate Tampa Bay area since the category 4 1921 Tampa Bay hurricane made landfall near Tarpon Springs and caused extensive damage throughout the region.

Over the past few decades, four major hurricanes were forecast to hit the Tampa Bay area from the south-southwest, which is a worse-case track that would result in a maximum storm surge event: Hurricane Donna (1960), Hurricane Charley (2004), Hurricane Irma (2017), and Hurricane Ian (2022). However, all of these storms veered to the east or northeast before reaching Tampa Bay and instead made landfall down the coast, resulting in serious damage in southwest Florida. Irma had the greatest effect on Tampa. It made landfall near Marco Island on September 10, 2017, and moved due north, passing through eastern Hillsborough County as a Category 1 storm and causing widespread issues in the area, particularly disrupting the electrical grid for several days.

Because of tremendous population growth and coastal development in the century since the last hurricane landfall combined with rising sea levels due to climate change, the Tampa Bay Area is considered one of the most vulnerable regions in the world to a direct hit from a major storm.

Seasonal trends

Summer
Summertime weather patterns predominate from late May through early October, which is the region's rainy season. Afternoon thunderstorms are regularly generated by the interaction of the Gulf and Atlantic sea breezes and are such a regular occurrence during the summer that the Tampa Bay area and nearby inland areas of Central Florida are recognized as the "Lightning Capital of North America". Afternoon thundershowers occasionally intensify into a severe thunderstorm, bringing heavy downpours, frequent lightning, strong straight-line winds, and sometimes hail.

Autumn
Average temperatures gradually fall beginning in September, and average daily rainfall amounts also decrease as autumn progresses; November is usually Tampa's driest month. However, rain totals in the fall can be augmented by passing tropical systems, which can dump several inches of rain.

Winter
Winter in the area is generally dry and cooler. Average high temperatures range from the low to mid-70s °F (21–23 °C) during the day to the low to mid-50s °F (11–13 °C) at night. Occasional cold fronts push through the area during the season, usually bringing a brief period of rain followed by daytime highs in the 50s °F (10–13 °C) and nighttime lows near 40 °F (5 °C) for a day or two. Tampa experiences occasional frosts, with an annual mean minimum temperature of 

Since the Tampa area is home to a diverse range of freeze-sensitive agriculture and aquaculture, hard freezes, although quite rare, are a major concern.

Spring
Tampa sees a slow increase in average temperatures beginning in mid-February, and spring brings mostly warm and sunny weather to the area. While temperatures in late spring approach summertime values, the rainy season does not usually begin until June, leading to the threat of brush fires from approximately late March until May. Occasionally, a late-season cold front pushes through the area, potentially bringing a brief round of severe weather followed by a few days of unseasonably cool temperatures.

Monthly averages

Cityscape

Neighborhoods

The city is divided into many neighborhoods, many of which were towns and unincorporated communities annexed by the growing city. Generally, the city is divided into the following areas: Downtown Tampa, New Tampa, West Tampa, East Tampa, North Tampa, and South Tampa. Well-known neighborhoods include Ybor City, Forest Hills, Ballast Point, Sulphur Springs, Seminole Heights, Tampa Heights, Palma Ceia, Hyde Park, Davis Islands, Harbour Island, Tampa Palms, College Hill, Water Street, Channelside and non-residential areas of Gary and the Westshore Business District.

Architecture
Tampa displays a wide variety of architectural designs and styles. Most of Tampa's high rises demonstrate post-modern architecture. The design for the renovated Tampa Museum of Art displays post-modern architecture, while the city hall and the Tampa Theatre belong to Art Deco architecture.

The Tampa mayor Pam Iorio made the redevelopment of Tampa's downtown, especially residential development, a priority. Several residential and mixed-development high-rises have been constructed. Another of Mayor Iorio's initiatives was the Tampa Riverwalk, a mixed-use path along the Hillsborough River in downtown. Channelside was recently approved to undergo major renovations by Tampa Bay Lightning owner Jeff Vinik along with Bill Gates and other investors. Several museums have already opened, including new homes for the Tampa Bay History Center, the Glazer Children's Museum, and the Tampa Museum of Art. The breakdown of development for the rest of the plan is as follows: 39% residential units, 29% office space, 15% hotels, 8% retail, 7% other, and 2% cultural uses. Mayor Bob Buckhorn continued these developments which are bearing fruit during the term of Mayor Jane Castor.

Tampa is the site of several skyscrapers. The city also has 147 high-rises, second only to Miami in the state of Florida. The structure was completed in 1992, and is the tallest building in Florida outside of Miami and Jacksonville.

Landmarks

The Sulphur Springs Water Tower, a landmark in the Sulphur Springs section of the city, stands 214 feet tall and was built by Grover Poole in the late 1920s. This boom period for Florida also saw the construction of an ornate movie palace, the Tampa Theatre, a Mediterranean revival on Davis Islands, and Bayshore Boulevard, which borders Hillsborough Bay from downtown Tampa to areas in South Tampa. The road has a  continuous sidewalk on the eastern end, the longest in the world.

The Ybor City District is home to several buildings on the National Register of Historic Places and has been declared a National Historic Landmark. Notable structures include El Centro Español de Tampa, Centro Asturiano de Tampa and other social clubs built in the early 1900s. Including L'Unione Italiana or the Italian Club, at 1731 East 7th Avenue in Ybor City. The Italian Club mission "is to preserve and honor the culture, traditions and heritage of the Italian Community and to maintain the historical facility as a functioning memorial to the working class immigrants."
Babe Zaharias Golf Course in the Forest Hills area of Tampa has been designated a Historical Landmark by the National Register of Historic Places. It was bought in 1949 by the famous "Babe" Didrikson Zaharias, who had a residence nearby, and closed upon her death. In 1974, the city of Tampa opened the golf course to the public.

The Story of Tampa, a public painting by Lynn Ash, is a  oil on masonite mural that weaves together many of the notable aspects of Tampa's unique character and identity. It was commissioned in 2003 by the city's Public Art Program and can be found in the lobby of the Tampa Municipal Office Building.

Park Tower (originally the First Financial Bank of Florida) is the first substantial skyscraper in downtown Tampa. Completed in 1973, it was the tallest skyscraper in Tampa until the completion of One Tampa City Center in 1981. The Rivergate building, a cylindrical structure known as the "Beer Can building", was featured in the movie The Punisher.

Spanning the southern part of Tampa Bay is the massive steel-span Sunshine Skyway Bridge.

Tampa is home to the Bro Bowl, one of the last remaining skateparks built during skateboarding's "Golden Era" in the 1970s. It opened in 1979 and was constructed by Tampa Parks and Recreation in 1978. It was the first public skatepark to be constructed in Florida and the third on the East Coast.

Other Tampa landmarks include the Tampa Riverwalk, which is a 2.6-mile-long (4.2 km) open space and pedestrian trail development along the Hillsborough River, and Curtis Hixon Waterfront Park.

Demographics

Tampa first appeared in the 1850 U.S. Census with a total recorded population of 974, which included soldiers stationed at Fort Brooke. Tampa did not report separately in 1860.

As of 2000, the largest European ancestries in the city were German (9.2%), Irish (8.4%), English (7.7%), Italian (5.6%), and French (2.4%).

As of 2010, there were 157,130 households, out of which 13.5% were vacant. In 2000, 27.6% households had children under the age of 18 living with them, 36.4% were married couples living together, 16.1% had a female householder with no husband present, and 42.9% were non-families. 33.7% of all households were made up of individuals, and 10.2% had someone living alone who was 65 years of age or older. The average household size was 2.36 and the average family size was 3.07.

In 2000, the city's population was spread out, with 24.6% under the age of 18, 10.0% from 18 to 24, 32.3% from 25 to 44, 20.5% from 45 to 64, and 12.5% who were 65 years of age or older. The median age was 34.7 years old. For every 100 females, there were 95.3 males. For every 100 females age 18 and over, there were 92.1 males.

In 2006, the median income for a household in the city was $39,602, and the median income for a family was $45,823. Males had a median income of $40,461 versus $29,868 for females. The per capita income for the city was $26,522. 20.1% of the population and 16.4% of families were below the poverty line. 31.0% of those under the age of 18 and 13.6% of those 65 and older were living below the poverty level.

As of 2000, those who spoke only English at home accounted for 77.4% of all residents, while 22.6% spoke other languages in their homes. The most significant was Spanish speakers who made up 17.8% of the population, while French came up as the third most spoken language, which made up 0.6%, and Italian was at fourth, with 0.6% of the population.

Religion

Communities of faith have organized in Tampa from 1846, when a Methodist congregation established the city's first church, to 1939, when a 21-year-old Billy Graham began his career as a spiritual evangelist and preacher on downtown's Franklin Street, and through to today. Among Tampa's noteworthy religious structures are Sacred Heart Catholic Church, a 1905 downtown landmark noted for its soaring, Romanesque revival construction in granite and marble with German-crafted stained glass windows, the distinctive rock and mortar St. James Episcopal House of Prayer, listed with the National Register of Historic Places, and the St. Paul AME church, which has seen the likes of Dr. Martin Luther King Jr. and President Bill Clinton speak from its pulpit. The latter two have been designated by the city government as Local Landmark Structures.

Tampa's religious community includes a broad representation of Christian denominations, including those above, and Baptist, Presbyterian, Lutheran, Christian Science, Church of God, United Church of Christ, Philippine Independent Church, Metropolitan Community Church, Seventh-day Adventist, Eastern Orthodox (Greek, Coptic, Syrian, and OCA), various Pentecostal movements, Anglicans, the Quakers, Jehovah's Witnesses, and the Church of Jesus Christ of Latter-day Saints. There is also at least one congregation of Messianic Jews in Tampa. There is a Korean Baptist church, a Mennonite church, several Haitian churches, and a Vietnamese Baptist Church. Tampa has several Jewish synagogues practicing Orthodox, Conservative, and Reform. In addition, there is a small Zoroastrian community present in Tampa. as well as several Unitarian Universalist congregations

Around the city are a handful of mosques for followers of Islam, as well as a Tibetan-style Buddhist temple, a Thai Buddhist Wat, and local worship centers for the Sikh, Hindu and Baháʼí Faiths. The Church of Scientology, based in nearby Clearwater, maintains a location for its members in Tampa.

Overall, Tampa is 50th out of the largest 51 metropolitan area in the percentage of the populace that attends religious services of any kind, with less than 35% of the population regularly attending services. Only the Portland, Oregon area is less observant.

Economy
Finance, retail, healthcare, insurance, shipping by air and sea, national defense, professional sports, tourism, and real estate all play vital roles in the area's economy. Hillsborough County alone has an estimated 740,000 employees, a figure which is projected to increase to 922,000 by 2015.

Since the year 2000, Tampa has seen a notable upsurge in high-market demand from consumers, signaling more wealth concentrated in the area. In 2021, the US Department of Labor awarded a two-year grant of nearly US$3 million to a program called "Connecting Talent to Careers" led by the Advanced Robotics for Manufacturing Institute and Tooling U-SME to deliver a rapid re-employment program to address a shortage of skilled labor in manufacturing in the region exposed by the COVID-19 pandemic.

Corporations and nonprofits
Several large corporations, such as banks and telecommunications companies, maintain regional offices in Tampa. The largest credit union in Florida, Suncoast Credit Union, is headquartered in Tampa.

Several Fortune 1000 companies are headquartered in the metropolitan area, including Bloomin' Brands, WellCare, Jabil, TECO Energy, and Raymond James Financial. Other companies headquartered in Tampa include Odyssey Marine Exploration, Greenway Health, College Hunks Hauling Junk, Arturo Fuente, J.C. Newman Cigar Company, Masonite International, Sykes Enterprises, Cott Corporation, The Melting Pot, Checkers and Rally's and The Mosaic Company

The main server farm for Wikipedia and other Wikimedia Foundation projects is in Tampa.

Downtown

Downtown Tampa is undergoing significant development and redevelopment in line with a general national trend toward urban residential development. In April 2007, the Tampa Downtown Partnership noted development proceeding on 20 residential, hotel, and mixed-use projects. Many of the new downtown developments were nearing completion in the midst of a housing market slump, which caused numerous projects to be delayed or revamped, and some of the 20 projects TDP lists have not broken ground and are being refinanced. Nonetheless, several developments were completed, making downtown into a 24-hour neighborhood instead of a 9 to 5 business district. As of 2010, Tampa residents faced a decline in rent of 2%. Nationally rent had decreased 4%. The Tampa Business Journal found Tampa to be the number two city for real estate investment in 2014.

Port Tampa Bay
Port Tampa Bay is now the seventh largest in the nation and Florida's largest tonnage port, handling nearly half of all seaborne commerce that passes through the state. Tampa ranks second in the state behind Miami in terms of cruise ship travel. Besides smaller regional cruise ships such as Yacht Starship and SunCruz Casino, Tampa also serves as a port of call for three cruise lines: Holland America's MS Ryndam, Royal Caribbean's Grandeur of the Seas and Radiance of the Seas, and Carnival's Inspiration and Legend.

MacDill Air Force Base

MacDill Air Force Base remains a major employer as the parent installation for over 15,000 active uniformed military, Department of Defense (DoD) civil service and DoD contractor personnel in the Tampa Bay area. A significant majority of the civil service and contractor personnel are, in fact, themselves retired career military personnel.

In addition to the 6th Air Mobility Wing, which is "host wing" for the base, MacDill is also home to Headquarters, United States Central Command (USCENTCOM), Headquarters, United States Special Operations Command (USSOCOM), the 927th Air Refueling Wing, Headquarters, United States Marine Forces Central Command (USMARCENT), Headquarters, United States Special Operations Command Central (USSOCCENT), and numerous other military activities of the active and reserve components of the armed forces.

Arts and culture

Arts and entertainment

Tampa is home to a variety of stage and performing arts venues and theaters, including the David A. Straz Jr. Center for the Performing Arts, Tampa Theatre, Gorilla Theatre, and the MidFlorida Credit Union Amphitheatre next to the Florida State Fairgrounds.

Performing arts companies and organizations which call Tampa home include the Florida Orchestra, Opera Tampa, Jobsite Theater, the Master Chorale of Tampa Bay, Stageworks Theatre, Spanish Lyric Theater, Tampa Bay Opera, and the Tampa Bay Symphony.

Current popular nightlife districts include Channelside, Ybor City, SoHo, International Plaza and Bay Street, and Seminole Hard Rock. Downtown Tampa also contains some nightlife, and there are more clubs/bars to be found in other areas of the city. Tampa is rated sixth on Maxim magazine's list of top party cities.

The area has become a "de facto" headquarters of professional wrestling, with many pros living and training in the area. WWE's former developmental territory, Florida Championship Wrestling, was also based in Tampa.

Tampa is home to several death metal bands, an extreme form of heavy metal music that evolved from thrash metal in the mid-late 1980s. Many of the genre's pioneers and foremost figures are based in and around the city. Chief among these are Deicide, Six Feet Under, Obituary, Death and Morbid Angel. The Tampa scene grew with the birth of Morrisound Recording, which established itself as an international recording destination for metal bands.

Christian rock band Underoath is based out of Tampa.

In 2009, the new Frank Wildhorn musical Wonderland: Alice's New Musical Adventure hosted its world premiere at the Straz Center.

Museums

The Tampa area is home to a number of museums that cover a wide array of subjects and studies. These include the Museum of Science & Industry (MOSI), which has several floors of science-related exhibits plus the only domed IMAX theater in Florida and a planetarium; the Tampa Museum of Art; the USF Contemporary Art Museum; the Tampa Bay History Center; the Tampa Firefighters Museum; the Henry B. Plant Museum; and Ybor City Museum State Park. Permanently docked in downtown's Channel District is the SS American Victory, a former World War II Victory ship which is now used as a museum ship. Florida Museum of Photographic Arts Features local and international photography exhibitions.

Children's Museum
The Children's Museum of Tampa opened in 1986. It was created in response to the need for informal cultural and learning environment for the need of young children. It has since grown into a Larger location in Downtown Tampa next to the Tampa Museum of Art and Curtis Hixon Park. This location opened in September 2010 and was renamed Glazer Children's Museum in honor of the Glazer Family Foundation that donated $5 million to the construction of the new building.

Cuisine
Tampa has a diverse culinary scene from small cafes and bakeries to bistros and farm-to-table restaurants. The food of Tampa has a history of Cuban, Spanish, Floribbean and Italian cuisines. There are also many Colombian, Puerto Rican, Vietnamese and barbecue restaurants. Seafood is very popular in Tampa, and Greek cuisine is prominent in the area, including around Tarpon Springs. Food trucks are popular, and the area holds the record for the world's largest food truck rally. In addition to Ybor, the areas of Seminole Heights and South Tampa are known for their restaurants.

Tampa is the birthplace of the Florida version of the deviled crab and the Cuban sandwich, which has been officially designated as the "signature sandwich of the city of Tampa" by the city council. A Tampa Cuban sandwich is distinct from other regional versions, as Genoa salami is layered in with the other ingredients, likely due to the influence of Italian immigrants living next to Cubans and Spaniards in Ybor City.

Several restaurant chains were founded or headquartered in Tampa, including Outback Steakhouse, The Melting Pot, Front Burner Brands, Carrabba's, Fleming's Prime Steakhouse & Wine Bar, Bonefish Grill, Columbia Restaurant, Checkers and Rally's, Taco Bus, and PDQ.

Tourism and recreation

The city of Tampa operates over 165 parks and beaches covering  within city limits; 42 more in surrounding suburbs covering  are maintained by Hillsborough County. These areas include Hillsborough River State Park, just northeast of the city. Tampa is home to a number of attractions and theme parks, including Busch Gardens Tampa Bay, Adventure Island, ZooTampa at Lowry Park, and the Florida Aquarium.

ZooTampa at Lowry Park features over 2,000 animals, interactive exhibits, rides, educational shows and more. The zoo serves as an economic, cultural, environmental and educational anchor in Tampa.

Big Cat Rescue is one of the largest accredited sanctuaries in the world dedicated entirely to abused and abandoned big cats. It is home to about 80 lions, tigers, bobcats, cougars and other species, most of whom have been abandoned, abused, orphaned, saved from being turned into fur coats, or retired from performing acts. They have a variety of different tours available.

Busch Gardens Tampa Bay is a  Africa-themed amusement park near the University of South Florida. It features many thrilling roller coasters, for which it is known, including Sheikra, Montu, Cheetah Hunt and Kumba. Visitors can also view and interact with a number of African wildlife. Adventure Island is a  water park adjacent to Busch Gardens.

The Florida Aquarium is a  aquarium in the Channel District. It hosts over 20,000 species of aquatic plants and animals. It is known for its unique glass architecture. Adjacent to the aquarium is the SS American Victory, a World War II Victory ship preserved as a museum ship.

The Tampa Bay History Center is a museum in the Channel District. There are theaters, a map gallery, a research center and a museum store.

Well-known shopping areas include International Plaza and Bay Street, WestShore Plaza, the SoHo district, and Hyde Park Village. Palma Ceia is home to the Palma Ceia Design District. Previously, Tampa had been home to the Floriland Mall (now an office park), Tampa Bay Center (demolished and replaced with the new Tampa Bay Buccaneers training facility, known as "One Buc Place"), and East Lake Square Mall (now an office park).

The Tampa Port Authority operates three cruise ship terminals in Tampa's Channel District. The Port of Tampa is the year-round home port for Carnival Cruise Lines' MS Carnival Paradise and seasonally, the MS Carnival Pride. Tampa is also a seasonal port for Holland America Line, Norwegian Cruise Line, Celebrity Cruises, as well as Royal Caribbean International's MS Rhapsody of the Seas and MS Radiance of the Seas. Cruise itineraries from Tampa include stops in the Western Caribbean islands, Honduras, Belize, and Mexico. Longer sailings include the Panama Canal, the ABC Islands and the Eastern Caribbean.

Events

Perhaps the most well known and anticipated events are those from Tampa's annual celebration of "Gasparilla", particularly the Gasparilla Pirate Festival, a mock pirate invasion held since 1904 in late January or early February. Often referred to as Tampa's "Mardi Gras", the invasion flotilla led by the pirate ship, Jose Gasparilla, and subsequent parade draw over 400,000 attendees, contributing tens of millions of dollars to the city's economy. Beyond the initial invasion, numerous Gasparilla festivities take place each year between January and March, including the Gasparilla Children's Parade, the more adult-oriented Sant'Yago Knight Parade, the Gasparilla Distance Classic, Gasparilla Festival of the Arts, and the Gasparilla International Film Festival, among other pirate themed events. The Gasparilla parade is the third largest parade in the United States.

Other notable events include the Outback Bowl, which is held New Year's Day at Raymond James Stadium. Each February, The Florida State Fair brings crowds from across the state, while "Fiesta Day" celebrates Tampa's Cuban, Spanish, German, Italian, English, Irish, Jewish, and African-Cuban immigrant heritage. The India International Film Festival (IIFF) of Tampa Bay also takes place in February. In April the MacDill Air Fest entertains as one of the largest military air shows in the U.S. Guavaween, a nighttime street celebration infuses Halloween with the Latin flavor of Ybor City. Downtown Tampa hosts the largest anime convention in Florida, Metrocon, a three-day event held in either June or July at the Tampa Convention Center. Ybor also hosts "GaYbor Days", an annual street party in the LGBT-friendly GaYbor district. The Tampa International Gay and Lesbian Film Festival, held annually since 1989, is the city's largest film festival event, and one of the largest independent gay film festivals in the country.

Tampa hosted the 2012 Republican National Convention and the 15th International Indian Film Academy Awards in April 2014.

Since 2015, Tampa has hosted the annual Tampa Riverfest, typically held during the first weekend of May. Held at the Tampa Riverwalk, the festival welcomes many musical artists and local restaurants.

Sports

*Co-champions, championship game canceled due to COVID-19 pandemic.

Tampa is currently represented by teams in three major professional sports leagues: the National Football League, the National Hockey League, and Major League Baseball. The NFL's Tampa Bay Buccaneers and the NHL's Tampa Bay Lightning call Tampa home, while the Tampa Bay Rays of the MLB play across the bay in St. Petersburg. As indicated by their names, these teams, plus several other sports teams, represent the entire Tampa metropolitan area. Tampa Bay's current professional teams have won eight combined championships in their respective leagues.

The Tampa Bay area has long been a site for Major League Baseball spring training facilities and minor league baseball teams. The New York Yankees conduct spring training in Tampa, and their Low-A affiliate Tampa Tarpons play there in the summer.

On the collegiate level, the University of South Florida Bulls compete in 17 sports in NCAA Division I and the University of Tampa Spartans compete in 20 sports in NCAA Division II.

Between September 2020 and July 2021 all three of Tampa Bay's major teams, as well as the Tampa Bay Rowdies, qualified for their sport's championship series. The Lightning beat the Dallas Stars in the 2020 Stanley Cup Finals, the Rays lost to the Los Angeles Dodgers in the 2020 World Series, the Rowdies and Phoenix Rising FC were named co-league champions after the USL Championship game was canceled due to COVID-19, the Buccaneers beat the Kansas City Chiefs in the Super Bowl, and the Lightning beat the Montreal Canadiens in the 2021 Stanley Cup Finals. This dynasty earned the area the nickname "Champa Bay".

Football

Buccaneers

The Tampa Bay Buccaneers began in 1976 as an expansion team of the NFL. They struggled at first, losing their first 26 games in a row to set a league record for futility. After a brief taste of success in the late 1970s, the Bucs again returned to their losing ways, and at one point lost at least 10 games for 12 seasons in a row. The hiring of Tony Dungy in 1996 started an improving trend that eventually led to the team's victory in Super Bowl XXXVII in 2003 under coach Jon Gruden. They won their second championship in Super Bowl LV with quarterback Tom Brady and became the first NFL team to ever win a Super Bowl at their home stadium.

Storm
Originally the Pittsburgh Gladiators and a charter member of the Arena Football League (AFL), the Tampa Bay Storm relocated from Pittsburgh in 1991 and won ArenaBowl V that year. They later won 4 more ArenaBowls (VII, IX, X, and XVII, and also appeared in ArenaBowl I, III, XII, XXIII and XXX), and their five championships were the most in league history. The AFL suffered through several years of decreasing revenue in the 2010s, leading to fewer active franchises. There were only five teams during the 2017 season, after which the Storm's ownership group suspended operations.

Bandits
Tampa was also home to the Tampa Bay Bandits of the United States Football League. The Bandits made the playoffs twice in their three seasons under head coach Steve Spurrier and drew league-leading crowds to Tampa Stadium, but the team folded along with the rest of the USFL after the 1985 season. They played at Tampa Stadium, which hosted the 1984 USFL Championship Game.

Vipers
The Tampa Bay Vipers play in the second edition of the XFL. Their inaugural season was cut short after five weeks due to the COVID-19 pandemic. The team relocated to Las Vegas, Nevada, and now are the Las Vegas Vipers.

Tornadoes
The Tampa Bay Tornadoes were founded in 2020 and describe themselves as the successors to the defunct Tampa Bay Storm. They play in the American Arena League.

Baseball

History
The Tampa Bay area has long been home to nationally competitive amateur baseball and has hosted spring training and minor league teams for over a century. Tampa became the first city in Florida to host a major league team for spring training in 1913, when the Chicago Cubs trained at Plant Field. The Tampa Smokers were the city's first minor league team, beginning play as charter members of the new Florida State League in 1919.

Rays
After decades of trying to lure an existing Major League Baseball franchise, the Tampa Bay area finally gained a team in 1998, when the expansion Tampa Bay Devil Rays began play at Tropicana Field in St. Petersburg. After a decade of futility on the field, the Devil Rays shortened their nickname to simply Rays in 2008 and promptly won the 2008 American League Pennant, finishing runner up in World Series. They also won American League East titles in 2008 and 2010 under manager Joe Maddon before slipping back in the standings.

In 2007, the Rays began the process of searching for a stadium site closer to the center of the area's population, possibly in Tampa. However, over a decade later, rivalry between Tampa and St. Petersburg and the challenges of financing a new ballpark have kept the Rays playing at Tropicana Field.

In 2020, the Rays won the AL East for the first time in a decade with the best record in the American League. Due to the COVID-19 shortened season, 16 teams made the playoffs, so the Rays had to play a best of 3 series against the division rival Toronto Blue Jays in the first round of the Rays postseason, where they swept the visitors in two games at Tropicana Field. then play a divisional series against the New York Yankees, which they won in 5 games at a neutral site in San Diego. The Rays then faced the Astros, who had defeated them in the divisional round the previous year. Tampa Bay went out to a quick 3–0 series lead, but Houston came back to tie the series 3–3. The Rays avoided the reverse sweep in Game 7 and won their second American League Pennant, then lost the World Series in 6 games to the Los Angeles Dodgers.

Low-A Southeast
Several Major League baseball teams conduct Spring Training in the area, and most also operate minor league teams in the Low-A Southeast. The major league New York Yankees and the affiliated minor league Tampa Tarpons use George M. Steinbrenner Field across Dale Mabry Highway from Raymond James Stadium.

Across the bay in Pinellas County, the Philadelphia Phillies affiliate Clearwater Threshers and Toronto Blue Jays affiliate Dunedin Blue Jays also play in the Low-A Southeast. Other nearby Low-A Southeast teams include the Pittsburgh Pirates affiliate Bradenton Marauders and the Detroit Tigers affiliate Lakeland Flying Tigers. The Phillies, Blue Jays, Pirates, and Tigers all play their Spring Training games at their minor league teams' ballparks.

The Tarpons have won five league titles, the Flying Tigers have won four, the Threshers have won two, and the Blue Jays and Marauders have each won one.

The area was formerly home to many teams in the former Florida State League that no longer exist, most notably the Tampa Smokers, St. Petersburg Saints, and the original Tampa Tarpons.

Hockey

Lightning

The NHL's Tampa Bay Lightning was established in 1992, and play their home games at Amalie Arena in downtown Tampa. In 2004, the team won their first Stanley Cup by defeating the Calgary Flames in 7 games. The Lightning lost the Eastern Conference Final in 2011 in 7 games against the eventual champion Boston Bruins. The Bolts were Eastern Conference champions in 2015, losing to the Chicago Blackhawks in the Finals. They returned to the Eastern Conference Final in 2016 but lost in 7 games to the eventual champion Pittsburgh Penguins. They returned again to the Eastern Conference Final in 2018 but lost in 7 games to the eventual champion Washington Capitals. The Lightning won their second Stanley Cup in 2020, defeating the Dallas Stars in 6 games. They would later win their third Stanley Cup the following year in 2021 after defeating the Montreal Canadiens in 5 games. Tampa hosted the skills contests and 2018 NHL All-Star Game weekend on January 27–28, 2018.

Soccer

Rowdies
The Tampa Bay Rowdies compete in the United Soccer League Championship after spending their first 6 seasons in the North American Soccer League. The team began play at Tampa's George M. Steinbrenner Field in 2010, then moved to St. Petersburg's Al Lang Field in 2011. The Rowdies won their first league championship in Soccer Bowl 2012. The Rowdies made the USL Championship Final for the first time in 2020, though it was cancelled due to COVID-19. The Rowdies and the other finalist, Phoenix Rising FC, were named co-champions by the league.

Previously, Tampa had hosted two top-level soccer teams. The Tampa Bay Rowdies of the original North American Soccer League was the area's first major sports franchise, beginning play in 1975 at Tampa Stadium. The Rowdies were an immediate success, drawing good crowds and winning Soccer Bowl '75 in their first season to bring Tampa its first professional sports championship. Though the NASL ceased operations in 1984, the Rowdies continued to compete in various soccer leagues until finally folding in 1993.

Mutiny
The success of the Rowdies prompted Major League Soccer (MLS) to award Tampa a charter member of the new league in 1996. The Tampa Bay Mutiny were the first MLS Supporters' Shield winner and had much early success beginning in 1996. However, the club folded in 2001 when local ownership could not be secured mainly due to a financially poor lease agreement for Raymond James Stadium. The city has no current representation in MLS, however, the Rowdies are seeking to join the league.

Basketball
The Tampa Bay Titans play in The Basketball League (TBL). Their home games are played at Pasco–Hernando State College.

The St. Pete Tide and the Tampa Gunners play in the Florida Basketball Association (FBA). The Tide's home games are played at St. Petersburg Catholic High School, and the Gunners are a travel team.

Amalie Arena was used as the home of the NBA's Toronto Raptors for the 2020–2021 season because of Canadian government regulations due to the COVID-19 pandemic in Canada. It was the first time an NBA team played home games in Tampa, though some exhibition preseason games had been played in Tampa between the Orlando Magic and Miami Heat prior to this.

College sports

University of South Florida

The University of South Florida is the only NCAA Division I sports program in Tampa. USF began playing intercollegiate sports in 1965. The Bulls established a men's basketball team in 1971 and a football team in 1997 and sponsor 17 teams in total. The Bulls joined the Big East in 2005, and the football team rose to as high as #2 in the BCS rankings in 2007. They are now part of the American Athletic Conference. USF has won six NCAA national championships: softball in 1983 and 1984, women's swimming in 1985, and sailing in 2009, 2016, and 2017.

University of Tampa

The University of Tampa Spartans compete in 20 sports at the NCAA Division II level in the Sunshine State Conference (SSC). They have won a total of 19 Division II National Championships, including eight in baseball.

Hillsborough Community College
The Hillsborough Community College Hawks are an NJCAA Division I junior college team and a member of the Florida College System Activities Association they compete in the Suncoast Conference and the Southern Conference in Region VIII of The National Junior College Athletic Association (NJCAA).

Major events hosted in the Tampa Bay Area

Super Bowls XVIII and XXV (Tampa Stadium)
Super Bowls XXXV, XLIII, and LV (Raymond James Stadium)
1984 USFL Championship Game (Tampa Stadium)
2008 World Series games 1 and 2 (Tropicana Field)
2004 Stanley Cup Finals games 1, 2, 5, and 7 (Amalie Arena)
2015 Stanley Cup Finals games 1, 2 and 5 (Amalie Arena)
2021 Stanley Cup Finals games 1, 2, and 5 (Amalie Arena)
Soccer Bowl 2012 Leg 2 (Al Lang Stadium)
ArenaBowl IX (Tropicana Field)
ArenaBowl XII and XVII (Amalie Arena)
2017 College Football Playoff National Championship Game (Raymond James Stadium)
1999 NCAA Division I Men's Basketball Final Four (Tropicana Field)
2008, 2015, and 2019 NCAA Division I Women's Basketball Final Four (Amalie Arena)
1978, 1979, and 1980 NCAA Division I men's soccer championship game (Tampa Stadium)
1990 and 1991 NCAA Division I men's soccer championship game (USF Soccer Stadium)
2012 and 2016 NCAA Division I Men's Hockey Frozen Four (Amalie Arena)
2009 NCAA Division I Women's Volleyball Final Four (Amalie Arena)
2015 NCAA Division I Men's Golf Championship and 2015 NCAA Division I Women's Golf Championship (The Concession Golf Club)
2021 USL Championship Final (Al Lang Stadium)

Future events planned to be held in the Tampa Bay area
2023 NCAA Division I Men's Ice Hockey Frozen Four (Amalie Arena)
2023 NCAA Division I Women's Volleyball Final Four (Amalie Arena)
2023 Tampa Bay Frog Swim (Gandy Beach)
2023 Swim Across America Tampa Bay (North Shore Park)
2025 NCAA Division I Women's Basketball Final Four (Amalie Arena)

Government

Mayor
Tampa is governed under the strong mayor form of government. The Mayor of Tampa is the chief executive officer of city government and is elected in four-year terms, with a limit of two consecutive terms. The current mayor is Jane Castor, who took office on May 1, 2019.

City Council
The City Council is a legislative body served by seven members. Four members are elected from specific numbered areas designated City Districts, and the other three are "at-large" members (serving citywide).

Fire department

The city of Tampa is served by Tampa Fire Rescue. With 23 fire stations, the department provides fire and medical protection for Tampa and New Tampa, and provides support to other departments such as Tampa International Airport, Hillsborough County Fire Rescue and MacDill Air Force Base 6th Medical Group.

Law enforcement

The Tampa Police Department has over 1000 sworn officers and many civilian service support personnel under a chief of police chosen by the mayor and approved by the city council.

Elections
Municipal elections are held on the first Tuesday of March and a runoff election, if necessary occurs on the fourth Tuesday of April. All city officials elected during the March elections takes office on May 1. The supervisor of elections Hillsborough County is responsible for all municipal elections in the city. Based on the legislation passed by the Board of County Commissioners for Hillsborough County, any registered voter may ask to receive accommodations in voting based on their specific health condition.

Other offices
There are several other government offices in the city apart from the Mayor, City Council, Fire Department and Police Department. There is a: City Clerk, Legal, Internal Audit along with a Revenue and Finance Department as well.

Education

Primary and secondary schools

Public primary and secondary education is operated by Hillsborough County Public Schools, officially known as the School District of Hillsborough County (SDHC). It is the eighth-largest school district in the United States, with around 189,469 enrolled students. SDHC runs 208 schools, 133 being elementary, 42 middle, 27 high schools, two K–8s, and four career centers. There are 73 additional schools in the district that are charter, ESE, alternative, etc. Twelve out of 27 high schools in the SDHC are included in Newsweek'''s list of America's Best High Schools.

Public libraries

Tampa's library system is operated by the Tampa-Hillsborough County Public Library System. THPLS operates 25 libraries throughout Tampa and Hillsborough County, including the John F. Germany Public Library in Downtown Tampa. The Tampa library system first started in the early 20th century, with the West Tampa Library, which was made possible with funds donated by Andrew Carnegie. Tampa's libraries are also a part of a larger library network, The Hillsborough County Public Library Cooperative, which includes the libraries of the neighboring municipalities of Temple Terrace and Plant City. The Hillsborough County Library Cooperative follows similar structure and design as the Pasco County Library Cooperative which is based on providing a network for all citizens and students of said county to be given equal opportunity and access to literature regardless of location.

Higher education

There are a number of institutions of higher education in Tampa.

The city is home to the main campus of the University of South Florida (USF), a member of the State University System of Florida founded in 1956. USF is classified among "R1: Doctoral Universities – Very high research activity" and is one of only three universities in Florida designated as a Preeminent State Research University. As of 2021, USF has the seventh highest undergraduate enrollment in the U.S. with over 51,000 students.

The University of Tampa (UT) is a private, four-year liberal arts institution. It was founded in 1931, and in 1933, it moved into the former Tampa Bay Hotel across the Hillsborough River from downtown Tampa. "UT" has undergone several expansions in recent years, and had an enrollment of over 9000 students in 2018.

Hillsborough Community College is a two-year community college in the Florida College System with campuses in Tampa and Hillsborough County. Southern Technical College is a private two-year college that operates a campus in Tampa. Hillsborough Technical Education Center (HiTEC) is the postsecondary extension of the local areas Public Schools district. The schools provide for a variety of technical training certification courses as well as job placement skills.

The Stetson University College of Law is in Gulfport and has a second campus, the Tampa Law Center, in downtown Tampa. The Law Center houses the Tampa branch of Florida's Second District Court of Appeal.

Other colleges and universities in the wider Tampa Bay Area include Jersey College, Eckerd College, Florida College, and St. Petersburg College in St. Petersburg.

Media

The major daily newspaper serving the city is the Tampa Bay Times, which purchased its longtime competition, The Tampa Tribune, in 2016. Print news coverage is also provided by a variety of smaller regional newspapers, alternative weeklies, and magazines, including the Florida Sentinel Bulletin, Creative Loafing, Reax Music Magazine, The Oracle, Tampa Bay Business Journal, MacDill Thunderbolt, and La Gaceta, which notable for being the nation's only trilingual newspaper—English, Spanish, and Italian, owing to its roots in the cigar-making immigrant neighborhood of Ybor City.

Major television stations include WFTS 28 (ABC), WTSP 10 (CBS), WFLA-TV 8 (NBC), WTVT 13 (Fox), WTOG 44 (The CW), WTTA 38 (MyNetworkTV), WEDU and WEDQ 3 (PBS), WMOR-TV 32 (Independent), WXPX 66 (ION), WCLF 22 (CTN), WFTT 62 (UniMás) and WVEA 50 (Univision).

The area is served by dozens of FM and AM radio stations including WDAE, which was the first radio station in Florida when it went on the air in 1922.

Infrastructure

Transportation

Roads

Three motor vehicle bridges cross Tampa Bay to Pinellas County from Tampa city limits: the Howard Frankland Bridge (I-275), the Courtney Campbell Causeway (SR 60), and the Gandy Bridge (U.S. 92). The old Gandy Bridge was completely replaced by new spans during the 1990s, but a span of the old bridge was saved and converted into a pedestrian and biking bridge renamed The Friendship Trail. It was the longest overwater recreation trail in the world. However, the bridge was closed in 2008 due to structural problems.

Tampa has several freeways which serve the city. There are two tolled freeways bringing traffic in and out of Tampa. The Lee Roy Selmon Expressway (SR 618), runs from suburban Brandon at its eastern terminus, through Downtown Tampa, to the neighborhoods in South Tampa (near MacDill Air Force Base) at its western terminus. The Veterans Expressway (SR 589), meanwhile connects Tampa International Airport and the bay bridges to the northwestern suburbs of Carrollwood, Northdale, Westchase, Citrus Park, Cheval, and Lutz, before continuing north as the Suncoast Parkway into Pasco and Hernando counties.

Three of the city's freeways carry the interstate highway designation. Interstate 4 and Interstate 275 cut across the city and intersect near downtown. Interstate 75 runs along the east side of town for much of its route through Hillsborough County until veering to the west to bisect New Tampa.

Along with the city's freeways, major surface roads serve as main arteries of the city. These roads are Hillsborough Avenue (U.S. 92 and U.S. 41), Dale Mabry Highway (U.S. 92), Nebraska Avenue (U.S. 41/SR 45), Florida Avenue (U.S. 41 Business), Bruce B. Downs Boulevard, Fowler Avenue, Busch Boulevard, Kennedy Boulevard (SR 60), Adamo Drive, and Dr. Martin Luther King Jr. Boulevard.

Airports

Tampa is served by three airports (one in Tampa, two in the metro area) that provide significant scheduled passenger air service:
Tampa International Airport (IATA: TPA) is Tampa's main airport and the primary location for commercial passenger airline service into the Tampa Bay area. It is also a consistent favorite in surveys of the industry and the traveling public. The readers of Condé Nast Traveler have frequently placed Tampa International in their list of Best Airports, ranking it #1 in 2003, and #2 in 2008 A survey by Zagat in 2007 ranked Tampa International first among U.S. airports in overall quality. During 2008, it was the 26th-busiest airport in North America.
St. Petersburg-Clearwater International Airport (IATA: PIE) lies just across the bay from Tampa International Airport in neighboring Pinellas County. The airport has become a popular destination for discount carriers, with over 90% of its flights are on low-cost carrier Allegiant Air. A joint civil-military aviation facility, it is also home to Coast Guard Air Station Clearwater, the largest air station in the U.S. Coast Guard.
Sarasota–Bradenton International Airport (IATA: SRQ) is in nearby Sarasota. Sarasota airport has more flights to Delta's Atlanta hub than any other city, but also serves several other large U.S. cities.

Rail
Tampa's intercity passenger rail service is based at Tampa Union Station, a historic facility, adjacent to downtown between the Channel District and Ybor City. The station is served by Amtrak's Silver Star'', which calls on Tampa twice daily: southbound to Miami and northbound for New York City. Union Station also serves as the transfer hub for Amtrak Thruway Motorcoach service, offering bus connections to several cities in southwest Florida and to Orlando.

Uceta Rail Yard on Tampa's east side services CSX as a storage and intermodal freight transport facility. Freight and container cargo operations at the city's seaports also depend upon dockside rail facilities.

Seaports

The Port of Tampa is the largest port in Florida in throughput tonnage, making it one of the busiest commercial ports in North America. Petroleum and phosphate are the lead commodities, accounting for two-thirds of the 37 million tons of total bulk and general cargo handled by the port in 2009. The port is also home to Foreign Trade Zone #79, which assists companies in Tampa Bay and along the I-4 Corridor in importing, exporting, manufacturing, and distribution activities as part of the United States foreign trade zone program.

Weekly containerized cargo service is available in the Port of Tampa. Cargo service is offered by Ports America, Zim American Integrated Shipping Company, and MSC which has recently partnered with Zim. 3,000 to 4,250 TEU containerships regularly call the Port of Tampa.

The bay bottom is very sandy, with the U.S. Army Corps of Engineers constantly dredging the ship channels to keep them navigable to large cargo ships.

Mass transit

Public mass transit in Tampa is operated by the Hillsborough Area Regional Transit Authority (HART), and includes public bus as well as a streetcar line. The HART bus system's main hub is the Marion Transit Center in Downtown Tampa, serving nearly 30 local and express routes. HART also operates a rapid-transit bus system called MetroRapid that runs between Downtown and the University of South Florida.

The TECO Line Streetcar provides electric streetcar service along eleven stations on a  route, connecting Ybor City, the Channel District, the Tampa Convention Center, and downtown Tampa. The TECO Line fleet features varnished wood interiors reminiscent of late 19th and mid-20th century streetcars.

Limited transportation by privately operated "Neighborhood Electric Vehicles" (NEV) is available, primarily in Downtown Tampa and Ybor City. Water taxis are available on a charter basis for tours along the downtown waterfront and the Hillsborough River.

The Tampa Bay Area Regional Transportation Authority (TBARTA) develops bus, light rail, and other transportation options for the seven-county Tampa Bay area.

Healthcare

Tampa and its surrounding suburbs are host to over 20 hospitals, four trauma centers, and multiple Cancer treatment centers. Tampa is also home to many health research institutions. The major hospitals in Tampa include Tampa General Hospital, St. Joseph's Children's & Women's Hospital, James A. Haley Veterans Hospital, H. Lee Moffitt Cancer Center & Research Institute, and the Pepin Heart Institute at Advent Health Hospital. Shriners Hospitals for Children is based in Tampa. Turning Point of Tampa founded in 1987 addresses behavioral health. USF's Byrd Alzheimer's Institute is both a prominent research facility and Alzheimer's patient care center in Tampa. Along with human health care, there are hundreds of animal medical centers including a Humane Society of America.

Utilities
Water in the area is managed by the Southwest Florida Water Management District. The water is mainly supplied by the Hillsborough River, which in turn arises from the Green Swamp, but several other rivers and desalination plants in the area contribute to the supply. Power is mainly generated by TECO Energy.

Notable people

Sister cities

Tampa has formalized sister city agreements with:

 Agrigento, Italy (1991)
 Ashdod, Israel (2005)
 Barranquilla, Colombia (2012)
 Boca del Río, Mexico (2002)
 Le Havre, France (1993)
 Heraklion, Greece (2019)
 İzmir, Turkey (1993)
 Lanzhou, China (2016)
 Oviedo, Spain (1992)
 Porto Alegre, Brazil (2013)
 South Dublin County, Ireland (2015)
 Veracruz, Mexico (2002)

See also
Baldomero López
List of metropolitan areas in the Americas
List of public art in Tampa, Florida
List of United States cities by population
National Register of Historic Places listings in Tampa, Florida
Seal of Tampa

Notes

References

Bibliography

External links

Official website
Tampa Bay Convention and Visitors Bureau
Tampa Chamber of Commerce
University of South Florida Libraries: archival, manuscripts and photographic collections
Tampa website dedicated to historic Tampa photographs

Tampa Changing – Historical and modern photographs of Tampa

 
Cities in Florida
Cities in Hillsborough County, Florida
County seats in Florida
Populated places established in 1823
Populated places on Tampa Bay
Port cities and towns of the Florida Gulf coast
1823 establishments in Florida Territory